Labor Law for the Rank and Filer: Building Solidarity While Staying Clear of the Law is a 1978 guidebook on labor organizing written by labor historian Staughton Lynd and organizer Daniel Gross.

Further reading

External links 

 

2008 non-fiction books
Books about activism
American political books
Labor literature
PM Press books
English-language books